The disruptive solutions process (DSP) is a form of iterative, low-cost, first-to-market development created in 2005 by fighter pilot and United States Air Force/Air National Guard Colonel Edward Vaughan. It is primarily used by the Air National Guard to prevent mishaps during the combat operations process.

Overview
The typical defense industry bureaucratic approach to problem-solving involves long lead times and relative inflexibility. Long development cycles and lead times results in solutions that are no longer relevant.

Recent attempts to resolve inefficiencies include overwhelming the problem with funding, resources, and manpower—for example, major weapon systems development, such as a new fighter jet or IT system. Conversely, when resources are constrained, bureaucratic staff adopt continuous process improvement, similar to kaizen, total quality management, and Lean Six Sigma. This perpetuates low-value programs that should be eliminated, rather than "improved".

Because most preventable safety mishaps are caused by human factors, safety should apply a disruptive, iterative approach that may not be appropriate in hardware-focused programs, such as aircraft production.

To address the cultural issues associated with mishap prevention in a large bureaucracy, the Air National Guard safety directorate used Boyd's Observe, Orient, Decide, Act Loop to assess the effectiveness of the process. This was the origin of DSP.

DSP is persistent and adaptive:"Persistence is about refusing to give up even in the face of adversity. Adaptation is about shortening the time to success through ingenuity and flexibility. 'Adaptive persistence' entails alternating between anticipation, changing course, and sticking with it, deftly navigating that paradox with aplomb."

History
The disruptive solutions process was first used in 2004, when a joint team led by Vaughan created Project Black Mountain. The project evolved from a combined requirement to share real-time tactical data among ground and air forces, as well as avoid mid-air collisions within the area of responsibility. The term 'disruptive' was borrowed from the marketing term disruptive technologies.

More recently, DSP has been used in the Air National Guard and the United States Air Force to field mishap prevention programs:

 See and Avoid: a web-based civilian-military midair collision avoidance program created by Vaughan and led by the Air National Guard Safety directorate from 2005 to 2009.
 WingmanDay.org:  provides tools for commanders, leaders, and care practitioners. In 2011, the program was relaunched as Wingman Day.  The Air Force Safety Center took the RealBase Toolkit concept and developed one-stop-shopping online tool kits hosted on the secure Air Force Portal.
 FlyAwake: a web-based fatigue risk management tool which returns quantitative fatigue analysis for a given flight schedule.
 Wingman Project: a suicide intervention initiative that shows family and friends of distressed Airmen how to intervene to save a life, providing training in 54 U.S. states and territories.
 dBird bird mortality model: tracks and predicts movements of pathogen-infected bird flocks using bird-aircraft-strike-hazard resources.
 Low Altitude Deconfliction Program: an online scheduling function with the Federal Aviation Administration's MADE program to avoid collisions for military aircraft operating in low-altitude environments.
 Ready 54: an online joint resiliency outreach and education tool with associated mobile apps.

On September 25, 2009, Dr. John Ohab of the American Forces Press Service interviewed Vaughan about DSP.

See also
 OODA Loop
 Problem solving
 Systempunkt
 Maintenance resource management
 Mid-air collision
 Intrapreneurship

Citations and notes

References
 Lee, Lynn "Face of Defense: Air Guardsman's Entrepreneurial Approach Earns Safety Award"
 Boyd, John, Organic Design for Command and Control 
 Kotnour, Jim, Leadership Mechanisms for Enabling Learning Within Project Teams in proceedings from the Third European Conference on Organizational Knowledge, Learning and Capabilities, Proceedings OKLC 2002 
 Osinga, Frans, Science Strategy and War, The Strategic Theory of John Boyd, Abingdon, UK: Routledge, .
 Richards, Chet, Certain to Win: the Strategy of John Boyd, Applied to Business (2004) 
 Ullman, David G., “OO-OO-OO!” The Sound of a Broken OODA Loop, Crosstalk, April 2007,
 Ullman, David G., Making Robust Decisions: Decision Management For Technical, Business, and Service Teams. Victoria: Trafford  – ties the OODA Loop into decision making processes.

External links
 The Wingman Project: Suicide Intervention
 See And Avoid: Civil/Military Mid-Air Collision Avoidance
 Richards, Chet: OODA explained. Seven-slide presentation explaining the OODA Loop
 Air Force Maintenance Resource Management: Human Error Reduction in Military Maintenance
 Macrosystems, primary contractor on some of the programs: Macrosystems
 Lockheed's Skunkworks: Kelly's 14 Rules
 Seamless Compassion, One-stop Automated Public Assistance: Seamless Compassion Link
 FlyAwake: Pilot Fatigue Mitigation

United States Air Force
Entrepreneurship
Strategy